Shelby Oaks is an upcoming American  supernatural horror mystery film produced, written, and directed by Chris Stuckmann in his feature film directorial debut. It stars Camille Sullivan, Brendan Sexton III, Michael Beach, Robin Bartlett, Keith David, Charlie Talbert, Emily Bennett, and Sarah Durn. Produced by Aaron B. Koontz and Paper Street Pictures, the film is set to be released in 2023.

Premise
The film follows Mia as she desperately searches for her sister Riley, who went missing along with her friends, a group of paranormal investigators called The Paranormal Paranoids. As her obsession for the truth grows, Mia begins to suspect that the imaginary demon from their childhood may have been real.

Cast 
 Camille Sullivan as Mia
 Brendan Sexton III
 Michael Beach as Detective Burke
 Robin Bartlett
 Keith David
 Charlie Talbert
 Emily Bennett
 Sarah Durn as Riley, Mia's sister

Production

Development 

In July 2021, YouTuber and film critic Chris Stuckmann signed on to write and direct a supernatural horror mystery film titled Shelby Oaks for Paper Street Pictures. The film is based on an online marketing campaign depicting a series of found footage videos about a fictional paranormal investigative team named The Paranormal Paranoids. The film was produced by Stuckmann, Aaron B. Koontz, Cameron Burns, and Ashleigh Snead.

Initially, the production was set to begin in late 2021, but was delayed due to insufficient funds and a potential strike between the International Alliance of Theatrical Stage Employees (IATSE) and the Alliance of Motion Picture and Television Producers (AMPTP).

Funding for the film was achieved via a Kickstarter campaign that began on March 1, 2022. On March 21, Shelby Oaks became the most-funded horror film project on Kickstarter after raising $650,000. The campaign crossed the $1 million mark from 11,200 backers by March 25. During the Cannes Film Festival in May 2022, Camille Sullivan, Brendan Sexton III, Michael Beach, Robin Bartlett, Keith David, Charlie Talbert, Emily Bennett, and Sarah Durn were revealed as the cast. Stuckmann and his wife Samantha Elizabeth co-wrote the story, while Andrew Scott Baird served as cinematographer.

Filming 
Principal photography commenced on May 9, 2022, and concluded on June 5. Filming took place in various locations in and around Cleveland, Ohio, including Greenwood Farm, Ohio State Reformatory, Chippewa Lake Park, and Cleveland Public Library.

Release 
Shelby Oaks is set to be released in 2023, along with screenings in Austin, Texas; Cleveland, Ohio; Los Angeles, California and New York City, New York.

References

External links 
 
 

2020s mystery films
2020s supernatural horror films
2023 directorial debut films
2023 films
2023 horror films
2023 independent films
American independent films
American mystery films
American supernatural horror films
Films based on Internet-based works
Films produced by Aaron B. Koontz
Films set in amusement parks
Films set in Ohio
Films set in prison
Films shot in Cleveland
Films shot in Louisville, Kentucky
Kickstarter-funded films
Upcoming directorial debut films
Upcoming films
2020s English-language films
2020s American films